A list of notable politicians from Slovakia. Note this list is missing some of the former presidents of Czechoslovakia of Slovak origin or higher-ranking officials which should be added for a more complete list.



A
Miroslav Abelovský
Marta Aibeková
Marián Andel

B
Peter Baco
Edit Bauer
Rudolf Bauer
Irena Belohorská
Július Binder
Vasiľ Biľak
Zoltán Boros
Martin Bútora

C
Rudolf Chmel
Bohuslav Chňoupek
Vladimír Clementis
Peter Colotka
Pál Csáky

D
Ivan Dérer
Michal Drobný
Alexander Dubček
Ján Ducký
Árpád Duka-Zólyomi

E
János Esterházy

F
Martin Fedor
Robert Fico
Ján Figeľ
Monika Flašíková-Beňová
Pavol Frešo
Martin Fronc

G
Ján Gabriel
László Gyurovszky

H
Pavol Hamžík
Štefan Harabin
Jozef Heriban
Andrej Hlinka
Milan Hodža
Zoltán Horváth
Pavel Hrivnák
Pavol Hrušovský
Jozef Miloslav Hurban
Gustáv Husák

J
Ľubomír Jahnátek

K
Robert Kaliňák
Ľudovít Kaník
Imrich Karvaš
František Kašický
Ivan Knotek
Ján Kollár
Sergej Kozlík
Zdenka Kramplová
Eduard Kukan
Miroslav Kusý
László Köteles
Milan Kňažko

L
Ján Langoš
Jozef Lenárt
Ivan Lexa
Daniel Lipšic

M
Alexander Mach
Jirko Malchárek
Marek Maďarič
Vladimír Mečiar
Jozef Migaš
Ivan Mikloš
František Mikloško
Ján Mikolaj

N
Robert Nemcsics

O
Štefan Osuský

P
Vladimír Palko
Pavol Paška
Zita Pleštinská
Ján Počiatek

R
Richard Raši
Pavol Rusko

S
Dušan Slobodník
Ján Slota
Richard Sulík

See also 
 Politics of Slovakia

Slovak
List
List